George Salameh (born 1 January 1976) is a Lebanese alpine skier. He competed in the men's slalom at the 2006 Winter Olympics.

References

External links
 

1976 births
Living people
Lebanese male alpine skiers
Olympic alpine skiers of Lebanon
Alpine skiers at the 2006 Winter Olympics
Sportspeople from Beirut
Alpine skiers at the 1996 Asian Winter Games
Alpine skiers at the 1999 Asian Winter Games
Alpine skiers at the 2003 Asian Winter Games